Katharine White (or variants) may refer to:

Writers
 Katharine Sergeant Angell White (1892–1977), writer and fiction editor for The New Yorker magazine
 Kate White (born 1951), editor-in-chief of Cosmopolitan Magazine

Sportspeople
 Catherine White (swimmer) (born 1965), British swimmer
 Kathryn White (cricketer) (born 1978), Scottish cricket player
 Catherine White (ice hockey) (born 1990), Canadian ice hockey player

Others
 Catherine White (doctor), British forensic physician
 Katharine Elkus White (1906–1985), New Jersey politician and United States Ambassador to Denmark
 Katie White (born 1983), English musician with The Ting Tings
 Catherine White, wife of abolitionist Levi Coffin
 Katherine Elisabeth White, better known as Marie Wilson